Xeromphalina fraxinophila is a species of fungus in the family Mycenaceae. It is a plant pathogen.

References

External links 
 Index Fungorum
 USDA ARS Fungal Database

Fungal plant pathogens and diseases
Tricholomataceae